Bruce R. Chizen (born 1956) is an American technology executive. He was the chief executive officer (CEO) of Adobe Systems from 2000 to 2007.

Education 
Chizen earned a B.S. from Brooklyn College (City University of New York) in 1978.

Career 
From 1980 to 1983, he worked in Mattel Electronics' merchandising group, helping it grow into a US$500 million business. In 1983, Chizen joined Microsoft as the company's eastern region sales director.

In 1987, he joined Claris as a founding senior manager and later held positions as vice president of sales and of worldwide marketing before becoming vice president and general manager of Claris Clear Choice.

In 1994 Aldus Corporation hired Chizen to run its consumer division in San Diego (what was formerly Silicon Beach Software). Later that year, Aldus was acquired by Adobe Systems and Chizen became vice president and general manager of consumer products. He was named CEO of Adobe in April 2000. His most notable action as CEO was the acquisition of Macromedia. In an interview, Chizen stated that the primary reason for acquiring Macromedia was to get Flash. During his 14 years at the company, Chizen engaged in transforming Adobe from a developer of graphics and publishing software into a leading diverse supplier of design, media, and business tools. On November 12, 2007, Adobe announced that Chizen would step down as CEO effective December 1, to be replaced by Shantanu Narayen, president and chief operating officer.

Chizen is a senior advisor for private-equity firm Permira, and has been a venture partner with Voyager Capital since 2009.. He also sits on the boards of Informatica, Oracle Corporation, Synopsys, Elemental Technologies, NDS, and FullStory. Chizen also sits on several nonprofit boards, including the Silicon Valley Education Foundation and of 1st Act Silicon Valley.

Personal life
Chizen lived in Los Altos, in Santa Clara County, California with  his wife and children.

References

External links
 Bruce Chizen's legacy
 PCMag Adobe CEO Bruce Chizen interview
 The alchemist of paper - The Economist article

Living people
Brooklyn College alumni
1956 births
American technology chief executives
Adobe Inc. people